Friends Church is a historic church at 314 W. Broadway in Maryville, in the U.S. state of Tennessee.

It was built in 1871 as a meetinghouse for the local congregation of the Society of Friends (Quakers). The Quakers were an important group in Maryville in the 19th century that played a major role in building the community's early schools, including the Freedman's Institute and Maryville Normal School. The single-story brick church is of Italianate design and is laid out on an ell plan.

Since 1940 the building has been used for Episcopal worship. It currently houses St. Andrew's Episcopal Church.

It is the oldest brick church in Blount County, and was listed on the National Register of Historic Places in 1989. It became a Blount County historic landmark in 2007.

References

External links
 St. Andrew's Episcopal Church website

Churches on the National Register of Historic Places in Tennessee
Buildings and structures in Blount County, Tennessee
Episcopal churches in Tennessee
Former Quaker meeting houses in the United States
Quaker meeting houses in Tennessee
National Register of Historic Places in Blount County, Tennessee
1871 establishments in Tennessee
Churches completed in 1871